Harbitz is a surname. Notable people with the surname include:

Alf Harbitz (1880–1964), Norwegian journalist, writer, critic and translator
Edmund Harbitz (1861–1916), Norwegian lawyer and politician 
Georg Prahl Harbitz (1802–1889), Norwegian priest and politician
Johannes Winding Harbitz (1831–1917), Norwegian politician